Richard Cramm (October 13, 1889 – 1958) was a lawyer and politician in Newfoundland. He represented Bay de Verde in the Newfoundland House of Assembly from 1923 to 1928.

The son of John Cramm and Margaret King, he was born in Small Point and was educated in nearby Salem, at the Tilton Seminary in New Hampshire and at the Wesleyan University in Middletown, Connecticut. Cramm studied law and was admitted to practice as a solicitor in 1923. He was called to the Newfoundland bar in 1924 and was named King's Counsel in 1928.

In 1924, he married Ollie Lynette Moores.

Cramm was elected to the Newfoundland assembly in 1923 as a Liberal. After Richard Squires stepped down as leader, Cramm supported William Warren. However, after the Hollis Walker Report was released which recommended criminal charges against Squires, he joined the opposition and moved the motion of no confidence which brought down Warren's administration. He was reelected in 1924 as a Liberal-Conservative. He was named a minister without portfolio in the new cabinet and, in 1926, became acting Attorney General. Cramm was defeated in 1928 when he ran as an independent candidate in Carbonear. He returned to practising law in St. John's. In May and June 1932, he served as a minister without portfolio in the short-lived Squires cabinet. In 1949, he ran unsuccessfully as a Progressive Conservative candidate in the Canadian federal riding of Trinity—Conception.

In 1921, Cramm published a book called The First Five Hundred, about the Royal Newfoundland Regiment during World War I.

References

External links 
 

1889 births
1958 deaths
Liberal Party of Newfoundland and Labrador MHAs
Canadian King's Counsel
Attorneys-General of the Dominion of Newfoundland
Government ministers of the Dominion of Newfoundland
Tilton School alumni